Michael Burghers (b. c.1647/8 – 1727) was a Dutch illustrator and artist of the 17th century, who spent most of his career in England. He was commissioned to create maps, estate plans, and illustrations of stately houses, by the English aristocracy.

Biography
Michael Burghers was a Dutch engraver, who settled in England on the taking of Utrecht by Louis XIV. He lived mostly at Oxford, and on several of his plates he added Academiae Oxon. calcographus after his name.

He was  the author of a book, Ancient Mysteries Described, which was reprinted into the early 19th century.

Describing  Burghers' style, Joseph Strutt wroteHe worked almost wholly with the graver, in a stiff, tasteless style, without genius, or knowledge of the art of design. His drawing, when he attempted to draw the naked figure is wholly defective. He has, though, painfully preserved many ancient reliques, the originals of which are now lost. 

Strutt thought that Burghers' best plates were his copies after Claude Mellan, and his topographical work, much of it for the antiquary Thomas Hearne.

He died on 10 January 1726–7.

Works
From 1676 Burghers engraved the plates for the Almanacks of the university. His most esteemed prints are his antiquities, ruins of abbeys, and other curiosities. He also engraved  several portraits and plates for the classics. They include:

Book illustrations

Illustrations to  Dr. Plot's Natural History of Oxfordshire. Being an Essay towards the Natural History of England. 1677.
Illustrations to Robert Plot's Natural History of Staffordshire. 1686. (pictured)
Illustrations to Dr. White Kennet's History of Ambroseden.
Illustrations to the fourth edition of Milton's Paradise Lost, published by Jacob Tonson. Burghers engraved eleven of the twelve plates; seven of them after drawings by J.B. de Medina; the drawings for the others may have been by Henry Aldrich.
Engravings of ichnographies in Browne Willis's Survey of York, Durham, Carlisle, Chester, Man, Lichfield, Hereford, Worcester, Gloucester, and Bristol Cathedrals. 1727. The exception is Man.

Other plates
William Somner, the antiquary; after van Dyck (pictured)
Franciscus Junius; after the same.
John Barefoot, letter doctor to the University. 1681.
 Illustrated Plate in Philosophical Transactions, 1684, vol 14.
Head of James II for an Almanack. 1686.
Anthony à Wood; in a niche; his only mezzotint.
King Alfred; from a MS. in the Bodleian Library.
Sir Thomas Bodley; in the corners of the plate are the heads of the other benefactors of the Bodleian Library; William, Earl of Pembroke, Archbishop Laud, Sir Kenelm Digby, and John Selden. The plate was published as a frontispiece to a catalogue of manuscripts in the library.
Timothy Hatton, provost of Queen's College.
Dr. Wallis. 1699.
Sir Thomas Wyat.
John Baliol.
Devorguilla, his spouse.
Dr. Ratcliff.
The Visage of Christ; engraved in the manner of Claude Mellan, with a single line.

Notes

References
 

1640s births
1727 deaths
Dutch engravers
Dutch illustrators
Dutch expatriates in England
Artists from Utrecht